Linda Adler-Kassner is an educator and university administrator. She is known for her work in the field of writing studies, including co-authoring Naming What We Know: Threshold Concepts of Writing Studies, which was recognized by the Council of Writing Program Administrators.

Education and career 
Adler-Kassner received her B.A. from Macalester College in 1985. She earned her M.A. in 1992 and she received her Ph.D. from the University of Minnesota in 1995. Adler-Kassner had taught at the University of Michigan-Dearborn and Eastern Michigan University. From 2009–2015, she served as director of the University of California, Santa Barbara's Writing Program. , she is the faculty director of the Center for Innovative Teaching, Research, and Learning (CITRAL), a professor of writing studies, and Associate Vice Chancellor at the University of California, Santa Barbara. 

From 2009 to 2011, Adler-Kassner was president of the Council of Writing Program Administrators. While serving in this role, she Framework for Success in Postsecondary Writing, a policy document used by institutions and writing programs to guide writing pedagogy.

In 2017, she chaired the Conference on College Composition and Communication.

Research 
Adler-Kassner's research areas broadly include literacy studies with attention to inclusive pedagogies. Her work includes the nature of writing as a learning method and process of discovery. Recent research, as published in her two Naming What We Know books, has focused on the disciplinary knowledge of composition studies, threshold concepts, writing knowledge transfer, genre studies, and reflective writing. Additionally, Naming What We Know has contributed to new developments in information literacy and the practical application of threshold concepts across disciplines. Earlier in her career, Adler-Kassner's scholarship covered topics such as basic writing and community literacy.

Selected publications

Awards and honors

 Council of Writing Program Administrators - Special Award for Outstanding Scholarship (2016) for Naming What We Know (Utah State University Press)
 Council of Writing Program Administrators - Best Book Award (2008-2010) for The Activist WPA (Utah State University Press)

References

External links 

 

Faculty Profile at UC Santa Barbara

Year of birth missing (living people)
Living people